The 1996 New Zealand general election was held on 12 October 1996 to determine the composition of the 45th New Zealand Parliament. It was notable for being the first election to be held under the new mixed-member proportional (MMP) electoral system, and produced a parliament considerably more diverse than previous elections. It saw the National Party, led by Jim Bolger, retain its position in government, but only after protracted negotiations with the smaller New Zealand First party to form a coalition. New Zealand First won a large number of seats—including every Māori electorate, traditionally held by Labour. Its position as "kingmaker", able to place either of the two major parties into government, was a significant election outcome.

Under the new MMP system, 65 members were elected in single-member districts by first-past-the-post voting, while a further 55 "top-up" members were allocated from closed lists to achieve a proportional distribution based on each party's share of the nationwide party vote.

This election was held seven months after the 1996 Australian Federal election and it is the last time to date that both countries across the Tasman held national elections in the same year.

Background

Changes mid-term
In the 1993 election, the National Party and the Labour Party had won 50 and 45 seats, respectively. The Alliance and the New Zealand First party had each won two seats. In the approach to MMP, however, there had been considerable rearrangement in parliament, with three new parties being established. As such, the situation just before the 1996 election was markedly different from the situation that had been established at the 1993 election.

Electoral redistribution
The 1996 election was notable for the significant change of electorate boundaries, based on the provisions of the Electoral Act 1993. Because of the introduction of the MMP electoral system, the number of electorates had to be reduced, leading to significant changes. Under MMP, there would be only 65 district members, down by 34 from the number elected in the 1993 election. 

Many electorates were abolished, with their territories being incorporated into completely new electoral districts. More than half of the electorates contested in 1996 were newly constituted, and most of the remainder had seen significant boundary changes. Wanganui was renamed as Whanganui. In total, 73 electorates were abolished, 29 electorates were newly created, and 10 electorates were recreated, giving a net loss of 34 electorates.

South Island
Since the 1967 electoral redistribution, the South Island had its number of general electorates fixed at 25. For the 1996 election and onwards, the number of South Island electorates is fixed at 16. The number of electors on the general roll of the South Island divided by 16 gives the target size for North Island and Māori electorates; this is referred to as the South Island quota.

Six existing electorates (and ) were kept. Seven electorates (and ) were newly formed. Three electorates (and ) were recreated.

North Island
Based on the calculation described above, the target size for North Island electorates resulted in 44 of them being required.

Twenty existing electorates (and ) were kept. Seventeen electorates (and ) were newly formed. Eight electorates (and ) were recreated.

Māori electorates
All four existing Māori electorates (and ) were abolished.

List seats
The House of Representatives was to have 120 seats, of which 65 were filled through electorate MPs (16 from South Island electorates, 44 from North Island electorates, and 5 from Māori electorates). This left 55 list seats to be filled. An outcome of the election was that no overhang seats were required.

MPs retiring in 1996
Eleven MPs intended to retire at the end of the 44th Parliament.

The election
The date of the 1996 election was 12 October; it was brought forward slightly to avoid the need for a by-election following the resignation of Michael Laws, as a by-election is not needed if there will be a general election within 6 months of a seat being vacated.

Of the 2,418,587 people registered to vote, 88.3% turned out to vote. The turnout was a slight improvement on the previous two elections, but still slightly lower than what would have been expected during the 1980s. The number of seats being contested was 120, an increase of 21 from the previous election, but as 55 of the new seats were for list candidates, the number of electorates was reduced considerably and many electorates had their boundaries amended or were abolished. While the number of general electorates decreased from 95 (1993) to 60 (1996), the number of Māori electorates increased from 4 to 5.

In the election 842 candidates stood, and there were 21 registered parties with party lists. Of the candidates, 459 were electorate and list, 152 were electorate only, and 231 were list only. 73% of candidates (616) were male and 27% (226) female.

Summary of results
The 1996 election eventually saw a victory for the governing National Party, which won around a third of the vote. The opposition Labour Party won slightly less. The election, however, was not decided by the comparative strengths of the major parties – rather, the smaller New Zealand First party, which won 17 seats, including 5 Māori seats won by the Tight Five, and was placed in the position of "kingmaker", able to provide the necessary majority to whichever side it chose. Although predicted by many to ally with Labour, on 10 December 1996 New Zealand First leader Winston Peters chose to form a coalition with National, thus preserving Prime Minister Jim Bolger's administration.

The 1996 election effectively showcased the difference made by the new electoral system. The Alliance and New Zealand First, both of which held two seats each in the old parliament, increased their representation to 13 and 17 seats, respectively, as a result of the change. The new ACT New Zealand also benefited, taking eight seats. The new United New Zealand party however was virtually wiped out, retaining only a single seat. The Conservative Party also only established only in previous Parliament by defecting Members of Parliament fared even worse, failing to remain in parliament at all. Strategic voting took place for the first time in a New Zealand MMP election in the Wellington seats of Ohariu-Belmont and Wellington Central.

However, Labour did manage to retain its status as among the top-two parties, as polls in the 1993–1996 period had shown Labour was in danger of being overtaken by the Alliance or New Zealand First. Labour's success was credited largely to its leader Helen Clark being seen as having convincingly won the election debates and running a strong campaign on health, education and social services, while Bolger was said to have run a lackluster campaign.

Also notable in the 1996 election campaign was the Christian Coalition, an alliance of the Christian Democrats and the Christian Heritage Party. Although the party had briefly crossed the 5% threshold in some polls, it gained only 4.33% at the election, and therefore did not qualify for parliamentary representation. With the exception of the Maori Ratana movement, this is the closest that an overtly religious party has come to winning representation in parliament.

Voters were prepared with MMP to vote for minor party candidates with their electorate vote, hence in a number of electorates won by National or Labour the other major party candidate came third or even fourth; previously the two top polling candidates were almost always National and Labour.

Detailed results

| colspan=11 align=center| 
|- style="text-align:center;"
! colspan=2 rowspan=2 style="width:213px;" | Party
! Colspan=2 | Party vote
! Colspan=3 | Electorate vote
! Colspan=4 | Seats
|- style="text-align:center;"
! Votes
! %
! Votes
! %
! Change(pp)
! List
! Electorate
! Total
! +/-
|-
| 
| 701,315
| 33.84
| 699,073
| 33.91
| 1.14
| 14
| 30
| 44
| 6
|-
| 
| 584,159
| 28.19
| 640,884
| 31.08
| 3.60
| 11
| 26
| 37
| 8
|-
| 
| 276,603
| 13.35
| 278,103
| 13.49
| 5.09
| 11
| 6
| 17
| 15
|-
| 
| 209,347
| 10.10
| 231,944
| 11.25
| 6.96
| 12
| 1
| 13
| 11
|-
| 
| 126,442
| 6.10
| 77,319
| 3.75
| new
| 7
| 1
| 8
| new
|-
| 
| 18,245
| 0.88
| 42,666
| 2.07
| new
| 0
| 1
| 1
| new
|-
| 
| 89,716
| 4.33
| 31,995
| 1.55
| 0.47
| 0
| 0
| 0
| 0
|-
| 
| 34,398
| 1.66
| 3,420
| 0.17
| new
| 0
| 0
| 0
| new
|-
| 
| 5,990
| 0.29
| 12,177
| 0.59
| 0.02
| 0
| 0
| 0
| 0
|-
| 
| 5,288
| 0.26
| 7,437
| 0.36
| new
| 0
| 0
| 0
| new
|-
|
| 4,070
| 0.20
| 4,763
| 0.23
| 0.06
| 0
| 0
| 0
| 0
|-
|
| 3,543
| 0.17
| —
| —
| —
| 0
| —
| 0
| new
|-
| 
| 3,189
| 0.15
| 5,385
| 0.26
| 0.05
| 0
| 0
| 0
| 0
|-
| style="background-color:#F93" |
| style="text-align:left;" |Ethnic Minority Party
| 2,514
| 0.12
| —
| —
| —
| 0
| —
| 0
| new
|-
|
| 2,363
| 0.11
| 1,140
| 0.06
| new
| 0
| 0
| 0
| new
|-
|
| 1,431
| 0.07
| 4,377
| 0.21
| new
| 0
| 0
| 0
| new
|-
|
| 1,244
| 0.06
| 686
| 0.03
| new
| 0
| 0
| 0
| new
|-
|
| 949
| 0.05
| 637
| 0.03
| new
| 0
| 0
| 0
| new
|-
|
| 671
| 0.03
| 553
| 0.03
| new
| 0
| 0
| 0
| new
|-
|
| 478
| 0.02
| 293
| 0.01
| new
| 0
| 0
| 0
| new
|-
|
| 404
| 0.02
| 818
| 0.04
| new
| 0
| 0
| 0
| new
|-
| 
| —
| —
| 134
| 0.01
| new
| 0
| 0
| 0
| new
|-
| style="background-color:#ffffff" |
| style="text-align:left;" |Unregistered Parties
| —
| —
| 1,506
| 0.07
| —
| 0
| 0
| 0
| 0
|-
| 
| —
| —
| 16,436
| 0.80
| —
| 0
| 0
| 0
| 0
|-
! colspan=2 style="text-align:left;" | Valid Votes
! 2,072,359
! 97.06
! 2,061,746
! 96.56
! —
! Colspan=4 |
|-
| colspan=2 style="text-align:left;" | Informal votes
| 8,183
| 0.38
| 18,796
| 0.88
! —
! Colspan=4 |
|-
| colspan=2 style="text-align:left;" | Disallowed votes
| 54,633
| 2.56
| 54,633
| 2.56
! —
! Colspan=4 |
|-
! colspan=2 style="text-align:left;" | Total
! 2,135,175
! 100
! 2,135,175
! 100
!
! 55
! 65
! 120
! 21a
|-
| colspan=2 style="text-align:left;" | Eligible voters and Turnout
| 2,418,587
| 88.28
| 2,418,587
| 88.28
| 5.46
| Colspan=4 |
|}
In addition to the registered parties listed above, a number of unregistered parties also contested the election. Being unregistered, they could not submit party lists (and thus receive party votes), but they could still stand candidates in individual electorates. Among the parties to do this were the Indigenous Peoples Party, the New Zealand Progressive Party (unrelated to the 2002–2012 party of the same name) and the Nga Iwi Morehu Movement. Most unregistered parties stood only a single candidate, with only four parties running in multiple electorates. In total, around 1,500 people voted for candidates from unregistered parties. In addition, 26 independents contested electorate seats. A total of 16,436 people voted for independent candidates. No candidate from an unregistered party or an independent candidate won an electorate seat.

Votes summary

Electorate results

No party managed to win a straight majority of the 65 electorates. The National Party, the governing party, was three seats short of a majority, gaining 30 seats. The Labour Party, in opposition, won 26 electorate seats. New Zealand First won six electorate seats, the highest number of any minor party for over 50 years.

The Alliance, ACT and United managed to win one electorate seat each.

For the most part, traditional patterns prevailed when it came to the distribution of electorates – National performed best in rural areas, while Labour was strongest in the cities. A very significant departure from traditional patterns, however, was New Zealand First's capture of all five Maori seats, which had traditionally been Labour strongholds. Although Labour was to reclaim these seats in the subsequent election, Labour's monopoly was no longer so secure as it had been.

The table below shows the results of the 1996 general election:

Key

|-
 |colspan=10 style="background-color:#FFDEAD" | General electorates
|-

|-
 |colspan=10 style="background-color:#FFDEAD" | Māori electorates
|-

|}

List results

Notes
 These party list members later entered parliament in the term as other list MPs elected resigned from parliament.
 These party list members later resigned during the parliamentary term.

Summary of seat changes
Seats captured:
By National: Hamilton East, Hamilton West and Nelson were captured from Labour. North Shore was captured from United.
By Labour: Auckland Central was captured from the Alliance.
Seats transferred from departing MPs to new MPs:
The seats of Albany, Otago, Rotorua and Waitakere, all held by departing National MPs, were won by new National candidates. One departing MP retired, one was re-elected in a different electorate, and two became list MPs.
The seats of Christchurch Central, Mangere and New Lynn, all held by departing Labour MPs, were won by new Labour candidates. One departing MP retired and two became list MPs.

Further reading

Notes

References

External links
1996 General Election - Official Results and Statistics, Chief Electoral Office, New Zealand Ministry of Justice.

 
October 1996 events in New Zealand